Seaham Hall is an English country house, now run as a spa hotel, in County Durham.

History
Seaham Hall was built in the 1790s by Sir Ralph Milbanke, 6th Baronet. In 1815 the poet Lord Byron married Anne Isabella Milbanke at Seaham Hall. The fruit of their marriage was Ada Lovelace, the mathematician and pioneer of computing.

Londonderry
Seaham Hall was one of the many properties acquired by Charles William Vane, 3rd Marquess of Londonderry through his second marriage to Lady Frances Anne Vane-Tempest in 1819. She was one of the greatest heiresses of the time. They purchased the Seaham estate in 1821 from Sir Ralph Milbanke for £63,000  and developed it into what is now the modern harbour town of Seaham. This town was designed to rival nearby Sunderland. The title Viscount Seaham was created as a courtesy title for the eldest son of the marriage, who became Earl Vane on his father's death; however, when the 4th Marquess of Londonderry died childless Earl Vane inherited the Londonderry titles and his eldest son took the courtesy title Viscount Castlereagh.

However, for much of his life the 5th Marquess lived at Plas Machynlleth, his wife's home in Montgomeryshire. The family did not spend much time at Seaham but used their Irish house - Mount Stewart, which was more impressive.

Benjamin Disraeli visited Seaham Hall in 1861.

Following the death of the 6th Marquess in 1915, his son the 7th Marquess put the hall at the disposal of the authorities to use as a hospital during the Great War, and it subsequently continued in use as a general hospital before closing in 1978.

Modern use

The building during the 1980s and 1990s has been redeveloped as a hotel, a nursing home and finally a luxury 5 star hotel and Spa.

In 1984, it was acquired by the Jalal family of Sunderland, who worked at rebuilding, renovating and returning the deteriorated building to its former glory. It was opened in 1985 as the Seaham Hall Hotel and remained in the hands of the Jalal family for nearly six years. In 1991, it was sold by the Jalal family to Dr Mohinder Singh Mullea, a local doctor who also owned Tara House, an old people's residential home, and was officially converted to an old people’s home in 1991.

In June 1997, Seaham Hall was purchased by a local businessman, Tom Maxfield, and his wife Jocelyn.
The rundown, derelict building was transformed into the 5-star luxury hotel and spa and became part of the Tom's Company group of hotels.

See also
Londonderry House
Mount Stewart
Plas Machynlleth
Wynyard Park
Loring Hall

References

Seaham Hall at Keys to the Past
The history of Seaham at Keys to the Past
Historic photos of Seaham Hall

External links

Seaham Hall hotel website

Hotel spas
Hotels in County Durham
Houses in County Durham
Lewis Vulliamy buildings
Seaham
Vane-Tempest-Stewart family
Grade II listed buildings in County Durham